Lester Sherwood Moore (1871–1924) was an American architect.

Moore designed residential homes and other buildings in the early 20th century.  He was based in Los Angeles, California, United States, and is credited for being one of the first to recognize and appreciate Mission Style as a worthy architectural form.  Moore's office was located in the Tajo Building, #307, at the NW corner of First and Broadway in Los Angeles.

Biography
Moore, born in Topeka, Kansas in September 1871, was the second of five children born to Douglas J. and Cynthia A. Moore.  His father, a farmer, painter and occasional huckster, was a Canadian immigrant who fought with the 11th Kansas Cavalry during the American Civil War, but did not become a naturalized citizen of the United States until 1886.  He enlisted in the war as a private, but was a corporal before the war's end.  Moore's mother was born in Illinois.

After moving to California, Moore married Anna "Belle" Russ in Los Angeles on June 6, 1894.  Initially the two lived with Anna's parents, John and Louise Russ, but subsequently moved to 3301 Griffin Ave, Los Angeles.  They had two children.  Dorothy L. Moore was born in 1901 and Barbara M. Moore was born in 1906.  Around 1918 Moore and his family moved to Kern County, where he worked for the CCM (Chanslor-Canfield Midway) Oil Company as a Geologic Engineer.  Moore died in Los Angeles on October 11, 1924, at the age of 53. The 1930 Federal Census shows his wife Anna, and Daughter Barbara, were back living in Los Angeles with Anna's mother, who was now living at their old address on Griffin Ave.

Work
One of Moore's notable achievements is the "Montecito View House" (1909) which was declared Los Angeles Historic Cultural Monument #529 on April 23, 1991.  This 1909 house is a 1½ story California bungalow in the Craftsman style overlooking the Arroyo Seco from Montecito Heights, and is located at 4115 Berenice Place, Los Angeles.  Another was the Colonial Revival style "Reeves House" (1905) at 219 N. Avenue 53, in Highland Park, California, which was declared Los Angeles Historic Cultural Monument #380 on July 15, 1988, but was destroyed by fire on October 10, 2017.   He also designed the Thomas J. Washburn House (1911) which was purchased in 1941 by Hattie McDaniel, the first black actress to win an Academy Award when she won the Best Supporting Actress Oscar for her role as Mammy in Gone with the Wind.

Moore became associated with Riverside, California when he submitted plans for a new Riverside County courthouse in 1902. Moore did not win the contract, but he did subsequently design a number of homes and other structures in Riverside.  Many of the Riverside homes Moore designed were located in the somewhat exclusive area now known as the Rubidoux Heights Historic District, which included one section commonly referred to as "Banker's Row".

List of structures designed by Lester S. Moore

References

External links

General & Informational Links
University of Washington Libraries, Digital Initiative Program, Architect Database (Search the Architects for "Moore, Lester S.")
"City of Riverside Historic Districts and Homes Database"
"Mount Rubidoux Historic District Design Guidelines, Riverside, California" by Thirtieth Street Architects.  September 2, 1992
Brent C. Dickerson, A Visit to Old Los Angeles and Environs; (See "8. Broadway (part 2). First Street to Fourth Street." for a glimpse of the Tejo Building)

Photos of Lester S. Moore and Buildings he Designed
Photograph of Lester Moore at CCM Oil Company (1912 - tallest man in second row)
Apartment Building West Sixth Street Los Angeles (1900)
Moore on hiking trip (1904)
Moore on hiking trip (1904)
Montecito View Home; Charles J. Fisher, Historian (1909)
Hemet Public Library (1913)

1871 births
1924 deaths
Artists from Topeka, Kansas
Architects from California
Artists from Los Angeles
Architects from Kansas